Garfield Township may refer to:

Illinois
 Garfield Township, Grundy County, Illinois

Iowa
 Garfield Township, Calhoun County, Iowa
 Garfield Township, Clay County, Iowa
 Garfield Township, Hancock County, Iowa
 Garfield Township, Ida County, Iowa
 Garfield Township, Kossuth County, Iowa
 Garfield Township, Lyon County, Iowa
 Garfield Township, Mahaska County, Iowa
 Garfield Township, Montgomery County, Iowa, in Montgomery County, Iowa
 Garfield Township, Plymouth County, Iowa
 Garfield Township, Pocahontas County, Iowa
 Garfield Township, Sioux County, Iowa

Kansas
 Garfield Township, Clay County, Kansas
 Garfield Township, Decatur County, Kansas
 Garfield Township, Dickinson County, Kansas
 Garfield Township, Ellsworth County, Kansas
 Garfield Township, Finney County, Kansas
 Garfield Township, Jackson County, Kansas
 Garfield Township, Ottawa County, Kansas, in Ottawa County, Kansas
 Garfield Township, Pawnee County, Kansas, in Pawnee County, Kansas
 Garfield Township, Rush County, Kansas, in Rush County, Kansas
 Garfield Township, Smith County, Kansas, in Smith County, Kansas
 Garfield Township, Wabaunsee County, Kansas, in Wabaunsee County, Kansas

Michigan
 Garfield Township, Bay County, Michigan
 Garfield Township, Clare County, Michigan
 Garfield Township, Grand Traverse County, Michigan
 Garfield Township, Kalkaska County, Michigan
 Garfield Township, Mackinac County, Michigan
 Garfield Township, Newaygo County, Michigan

Minnesota
 Garfield Township, Lac qui Parle County, Minnesota
 Garfield Township, Polk County, Minnesota

Nebraska
 Garfield Township, Antelope County, Nebraska
 Garfield Township, Buffalo County, Nebraska
 Garfield Township, Cuming County, Nebraska
 Garfield Township, Custer County, Nebraska
 Garfield Township, Phelps County, Nebraska

North Dakota
 Garfield Township, Traill County, North Dakota, in Traill County, North Dakota

South Dakota
 Garfield Township, Clark County, South Dakota, in Clark County, South Dakota
 Garfield Township, Clay County, South Dakota, in Clay County, South Dakota
 Garfield Township, Douglas County, South Dakota, in Douglas County, South Dakota
 Garfield Township, Hamlin County, South Dakota, in Hamlin County, South Dakota
 Garfield Township, Roberts County, South Dakota, in Roberts County, South Dakota
 Garfield Township, Spink County, South Dakota, in Spink County, South Dakota

Township name disambiguation pages